The Central Bank of Egypt (CBE) is the central bank and monetary authority of Arab Republic of Egypt.

Currency 

Since the trading of gold and silver coins in Egypt and until 1834, there was no one unit of currency to unify the country. In 1834, a decree was realised stating the forging of an Egyptian currency based on the two metals (gold and silver). In accordance with said decree, the minting of a currency in the shape of gold and silver Riyals began. In 1836, the Egyptian pound was first introduced and it became open for public use.

The bank floated the Egyptian pound during the morning of the 13th of November 2016.

Functions
Its functions include
 Regulates banks and the banking system of Egypt;
 Formulates and implements Egypt's banking policy, monetary policy and credit policy;
 Issues banknotes;
 Manages gold and the foreign exchange reserves of the Arab Republic of Egypt
 Regulates and manages Egypt's presence in the foreign exchange market; 
 Supervises the national payments system;
 Manages Egypt's public and private external debt.

List of governors

Following is a list of the Governors of the Central Bank of Egypt:

See also

 List of central banks of Africa
 Economy of Egypt
 List of central banks

References

External links
 

1898 establishments in Egypt
Banks of Egypt
Egypt
Banks established in 1898